UTC−10:30 is an identifier for a time offset from UTC of −10:30.

History
Hawaii used a standard time of UTC−10:30 from 1896 until 1947, when the time zone was changed to UTC−10:00.

See also
Time in Hawaii

References

UTC offsets
Time in the United States